Bagaduce Lunch seafood restaurant is located in Penobscot, Maine. It is a James Beard Foundation Award winning restaurant (2008).

History 
Bagaduce Lunch was opened as a roadside fish shack in 1946 by Sidney and Bernice Snow, their granddaughter, Judy Astbury and her husband Mike have run the restaurant since 1996.  Judy's mother and father, Vangie and James Peasely, took over in 1967 and ran it for thirty years in between.

Menu 
The owners pride themselves on serving only fresh and locally sourced fish. It is a seasonal operation, generally open Memorial Day through Labor Day. The seafood menu has not changed since 1946.

Awards and honors
2008 James Beard Foundation Award America's Classic
MAINE-LY LOBSTER:  Best Lobster Shacks & Rolls
The Today Show named it one of the top ten lobster shacks in Maine

See also
 List of seafood restaurants

References

Seafood restaurants in Maine
James Beard Foundation Award winners
1946 establishments in Maine
Restaurants established in 1946
Buildings and structures in Hancock County, Maine